Panis may refer to
Aurélien Panis (born 1994), French racing driver
Jürgen Panis (born 1975), Austrian footballer
Olivier Panis (born 1966), French racing driver
 Panis (slaves), term for enslaved indigenous peoples in New France
 Panis (Rigvedic tribe), a Vedic tribe
Panis, an extinct bivalve in the family Bakevelliidae

See also 
 Pani (disambiguation)